Silvery World((Korean:은세계) is a Korean novel published by Lee Injik in 1908, categorized as sinsoseol, or new novel. By depicting how a wealthy farmer gets killed by a venal official, it denounces the corrupt feudal system of the late Joseon dynasty. The author wrote it with a plan to adapt it into a play from the beginning, and it was performed in Wongaksa as the first Korean sinyeongeuk, or new play.

Plot

Structure

Summary 
Choi Byeongdo, a rich farmer living in Gangwon-do, has a big dream of saving the country under the influence of the politician Kim Ok-gyun, supporter of an extensive reform. However, the new governor of his hometown, who is greedy for his money, arrests him and forces him to pay a bribe. He refuses the offer to be freed on condition that he hands over his fortune, and dies, giving in to torture.

Choi's daughter Ok-sun and son Ok-nam grow up with the help of his friend Kim Jeongsu and go to the United States to study. The siblings have a hard time paying for their education while abroad, but continue to study with the aid of an American missionary.

They return to their home country after ten years, after reading the news article entitled "Grand Reform in Korea," in 1907. In the country, the military men demobilized by the Japan-Korea Treaty of 1907 and militia men have begun to riot. The siblings go to a temple with their mother to pray to the Buddha, and then they run into the militia men. Ok-nam urges them to disband and claims that the country has to be developed first, but eventually he gets taken by the militia.

Discrepancy between the first part and the last part 
Many criticisms of Silvery World point out the discrepancy between the first part and the last part. Whereas the first part shows a strong disapproval of the Korean society at the time, in the last part, such criticism fades away.

Based on this discrepancy, some claim that it is a reworked version of "Choi byeongdu taryeong (최병두 타령, Song of Choi Byeongdu)." Specifically, they say that its first part is a rework of the traditional song, at the time performed by entertainers and master singers, and only its last part about what happens after the death of Choi is written by the author.

Main themes

Denunciation of the late Joseon 
The first part of Silvery World depicts a heroic life of the rich farmer Choi byeongdo who lives in Gangwon-do. He has accumulated his wealth with a clear purpose to make Joseon a "civilized country." But he cannot realize his ideal due to the widespread corruption of the late Joseon. It was common for officials to exploit the people to get a public post and maintain their status in those days when the corrupt feudal system was spread throughout the country. The first part of the novel criticizes and denounces the society that betrays the heroic figure.

Justification of the Japanese colonization 
That being said, in the last part, the critical voice drastically loses its power. The 'grand reform in Korea,' presented as the reason for the siblings to return to their home country, refers to the Japan-Korea Treaty of 1907, which enabled Japan to dethrone Emperor Gojong and take over the commandership of the Korean military. However, the fiction does not have any criticism of the imperialistic invasion of Japan, but rather glamorizes it as 'grand reform,' justifying the Japanese colonization of Korea.

The author, Lee Injik, founded a press and claimed the necessity of enlightenment before he gradually turned to rationalize the Japanese colonization. Around the time he published Silvery World, he was already fraternizing with pro-Japanese politicians, such as Lee Wan-yong and Jo Jung-eung. They asserted that the corruption in Joseon was one of the bad practices of the feudal system, and to solve this problem, Japan, a more developed country, had to rule Korea.

Critical reception and literary value 
The critic Lim Hwa acclaimed Silvery World for breaking out of the abstract prose of the traditional fictions and realistically depicting the situations of the contemporary period. The traditional fictions written before the 20th century are mostly set in China and advocates Confucian values, the ruling idea of the feudal times. On the contrary, this novel assumes a critical attitude towards the reality of the country and seeks how to solve its problems. Through the frustration and hardship that the protagonist Choi Byeongdo experiences, it successfully embodies the structure of the Korean society at the time.

It has also been commended for its modern use of the Korean language. Its first part contains a number of folk songs enjoyed by the people in those days. The farmers who appear in the novel express their lives with their own language and songs. Silvery World has a literary value as it captures the contemporary period with the language of the people, even though the concept of modern national literature was yet to be formed when it was published.

Adaptations

New play Silvery World 
The author wrote it with a plan to adapt it into a play from the beginning. In fact, a record of its performance in Wongaksa has been found. The play ran from November 15, 1908, but the date of its last performance is not known. There is a controversy over whether the play was in a modern or traditional style, but the truth is unknown as the original script is lost.

"Choi byeongdu taryeong" and Silvery World 
Another question with regard to Silvery World is the relationship between the work and "Choi byeongdu taryeong." Some argue that "Choi byeongdu taryeong"—it falls under the category of pansori, a Korean genre of musical storytelling—was enjoyed throughout Gangwon-do and the author wrote the first part of the novel based on this song. To support this argument, evidence of other works adapted from the song has to provided. However, other than Silvery World, there is no confirmed reworked version  inspired by the song. In addition, even its original text is yet to be found. Therefore, it is difficult to verify this assumption.

Still, the novel cannot be said to have been created solely by the author's imagination, as the master pansori singers who actively performed in those days mention the aforementioned song in their memoirs, though its original text is lost. Also, it is highly likely that, given the times, people sang songs about a venal official oppressing and killing a rich farmer. The fact that Silvery World includes long excerpts of folk songs supports the argument that the work of fiction is related to the pansori songs of the day.

Bibliography

Editions 
《은세계》, 동문사, 1908 / Eunsegye (Silvery World), Dongmunsa, 1908

《은세계/모란봉/빈선랑의 일미인》, 서울대학교출판부, 2003 / Eunsegye, moranbong, binseonrang-ui ilmi-in (Silvery World, Moranbong Mountain, A Poor Man and His Japanese Wife), Seoul University Press, 2003

《은세계》, 토지, 2018. (e-book) / Eunsegye (Silvery World), Toji, 2018. E-book.

Translation 
Silvery World and Other Stories, Cornell University East Asia Program, 2018.

References 

20th-century Korean novels
1908 novels